A capotain, capatain or copotain is a tall-crowned, narrow-brimmed, slightly conical "sugarloaf" hat, usually black, worn by men and women from the 1590s into the mid-seventeenth century in England and northwestern Europe.  Earlier capotains had rounded crowns; later, the crown was flat at the top.

The capotain is especially associated with Puritan costume in England in the years leading up to the English Civil War and during the years of the Commonwealth.  It is also commonly called a flat topped hat and a Pilgrim hat, the latter for its association with the Pilgrims who settled Plymouth Colony in the 1620s. Contrary to popular myth, capotains never included buckles on the front of them; this image was created in the 19th century.

It has been theorised that the capotain inspired the top hat.


See also
1550–1600 in fashion
1600–1650 in fashion
1650–1700 in fashion
List of headgear
 Toque
 Pilgrim's hat

References

Further reading
Ashelford, Jane: The Art of Dress: Clothing and Society 1500–1914, Abrams, 1996.  .
Arnold, Janet: Patterns of Fashion: the cut and construction of clothes for men and women 1560–1620, Macmillan 1985. Revised edition 1986. .
Black, J. Anderson and Madge Garland: A History of Fashion, Morrow, 1975. .

External links
 

16th-century fashion
17th-century fashion
Capotain
English clothing
History of clothing (Western fashion)
Plymouth Colony
English Civil War
Religious headgear